David Hewitt may refer to:
David Hewitt (rugby union, born 1939), retired Irish rugby union player
David Hewitt (rugby union, born 1980), Irish rugby union player, currently playing at Lansdowne
Dave Hewitt (rugby league) (born 1995), English rugby league player
David L. Hewitt (born 1939), film director and producer
Dave Hewitt (born 1961), editor of The Angry Corrie, a hillwalking magazine
Dave Hewitt (born 1950), musician, member of Babe Ruth
David W. Hewitt, American recording/mix engineer

See also
Dave Hewett, rugby union player
David Stanley Hewett, American artist